Soulinari is a village in the Greek regional unit of Messenia. It belongs to the Municipality of Pylos-Nestor.

Populated places in Messenia